Meike van Driel (born 12 July 1972) is a Dutch rower. She competed in the women's quadruple sculls event at the 1996 Summer Olympics.

References

External links
 

1972 births
Living people
Dutch female rowers
Olympic rowers of the Netherlands
Rowers at the 1996 Summer Olympics
Sportspeople from Voorburg
21st-century Dutch women
20th-century Dutch women